Meinl  may refer to:

Meinl (surname)
 Julius Meinl International, a manufacturer and retailer of coffee, gourmet foods and other grocery products

 Meinl-Weston, a manufacturer of brass instruments, based in Geretsried, Germany and formerly based in Graslitz; named after Anton Meinl
 Meinl Percussion, a brand of cymbals and general percussion instruments, based in Gutenstetten, Germany; named after Roland Meinl

See also 
 Meindl (disambiguation)
 Meinhard, community in the Werra-Meißner-Kreis in Hesse, Germany